The 1977 FIBA Europe Under-16 Championship (known at that time as 1977 European Championship for Cadets) was the 4th edition of the FIBA Europe Under-16 Championship. The cities of Le Touquet and Berck, in France, hosted the tournament. Turkey won their first title.

Teams

Preliminary round
The twelve teams were allocated in two groups of six teams each.

Group A

Group B

Knockout stage

9th–12th playoffs

5th–8th playoffs

Championship

Final standings

References
FIBA Archive
FIBA Europe Archive

FIBA U16 European Championship
1977–78 in European basketball
1977 in French sport
International youth basketball competitions hosted by France